Angelo Arturo Cameroni (1 April 1891 – 22 September 1961) was an Italian professional footballer who played as a goalkeeper.

He made his only appearance for the Italy national football team on 18 January 1920 in a game against France.

External links
 Career summary by playerhistory.com
 

1891 births
1961 deaths
People from Legnano
Italian footballers
Italy international footballers
Como 1907 players
Inter Milan players
A.C. Legnano players
Association football goalkeepers
Footballers from Lombardy
Sportspeople from the Metropolitan City of Milan